Darrell Adams (born September 16, 1983) is a former professional Canadian football defensive tackle for the Hamilton Tiger-Cats of the Canadian Football League. He was signed by the New York Jets as an undrafted free agent in 2006. He played college football at Villanova.

External links
Just Sports Stats
Hamilton Tiger-Cats bio
Villanova Wildcats bio

1983 births
Living people
Sportspeople from Queens, New York
Players of American football from New York City
American football defensive tackles
American football defensive ends
Players of Canadian football from New York (state)
Canadian football defensive linemen
Villanova Wildcats football players
New York Jets players
Hamilton Tiger-Cats players